"Mirror" is a song by American rapper Lil Wayne featuring American singer-songwriter Bruno Mars. The second bonus track on the deluxe edition of Tha Carter IV (2011), was released to Urban contemporary radio stations as the sixth and final single on September 13, 2011, through Young Money, Cash Money, and Universal Republic Records. The artists wrote the song alongside Phillip Lawrence and producer REO of the Soundkillers, with co-production from the Smeezingtons. The song leaked online a few days before the album's official release in the United States. The track was produced three years before its release. Owen, with Mike Caren's help, was able to get the track to several rappers, who rejected it. Lil Wayne liked the song after hearing it, however, and his verses were added to Mars's hook vocals already on the track.

Music critics gave "Mirror" positive reviews praising it for Mars's smooth, epic hook and Wayne's introspective verses. The hip-hop and rap ballad has been compared in its composition to "Lighters" (2011) by Bad Meets Evil featuring Mars and lyrically to Wayne's single "How to Love" (2011) from the same album. Its lyrics describe the downfalls of life, as well as Wayne's upbringing, state of mind, past choices and personal life. "Mirror" debuted at number 16 on the Billboard Hot 100 and peaked in the top 15 of Denmark, Netherlands, Switzerland, and Belgium (Flanders). It has been certified four times platinum by the Recording Industry Association of America (RIAA) and double platinum by the Australian Recording Industry Association (ARIA). 

Antoine Fuqua directed the accompanying music video, filmed in November 2011, with visual effects created by GloriaFX. It depicts Wayne throwing red, black and white paint on the walls of a room creating an undefined painting, while Mars sings on top of a ladder. The video ends with a scene showing a painting of Wayne, toned in red, crucified on a giant treble clef holding a mic in his left hand. Critics complimented its aesthetics. Wayne performed the song during his tour in Australia.

Release and production
"Mirror" was released as the album's sixth and final single. Young Money, Cash Money and Universal Republic Records released the track to American urban contemporary radio stations, which began adding the track to their playlists on September 13, 2011. On November 1, 2011, the single was re-released in the same format and to rhythmic contemporary stations by Cash Money and Universal Republic Records. The song was made available in the United Kingdom via digital download on December 18, 2011.

REO of the Soundkillers produced "Mirror" with co-production by the Smeezingtons. Dwayne Carter, Peter Hernandez, Philip Lawrence and Ramon Owen wrote the song. Michael "Banger" Cadahia and his assistant Edward "Jewfro" Lidow recorded it at CMR South Studios in Miami, Florida. The single was mixed at the Record Plant in Los Angeles by Fabian Marascuillo, with Ghazi Hourani as the mixing assistant. It was mastered by Brian "Big Bass" Gardner at Bernie Grundman Mastering.

Background and lawsuit
Ramon "REO" Owen created the instrumental three years before its inclusion on Tha Carter IV. The producer, Reo of the Soundkillers, with help of Mike Caren, Atlantic Records A&R, was able to get this recording, which already had Bruno Mars singing the hook, heard by industry "heavy-hitters" including rappers Kanye West, Drake, and Nas. They rejected it. Lil Wayne liked the track and decided to keep it. "REO" initially wanted the track to be a part of West's My Beautiful Dark Twisted Fantasy (2010). He to "settle[ed]" for it being included on Wayne's Tha Carter IV. He felt lucky it was given the amount of material recorded during the time an album is produced. Owen claimed he alone produced the track with the Smeezingtons as co-writers, however, the CD's liner notes also credit the team as co-producers. "REO" agreed that Wayne's verses captured the feeling of the song. The track leaked on August 25, 2011.

In late 2014, Ramon "REO" Owen filed a lawsuit against Wayne alleging he had promised him at least $91,000 for his work on the song. According to the lawsuit, Owen never received this payment. On February 19, 2015, Manhattan Federal Court judge, Katherine B. Forrest, order Wayne to pay Owen $100,000 and Young Money to "hand over" their accounting records, as they failed to respond to the allegations in court, after being served with the legal documents in December 2014. During the judgment, Owen stated that he tried to contact Wayne regarding the money for 11 months prior to the lawsuit. According to court filings, Owen is entitled to $91,841.50 in royalties.

Composition

"Mirror" is a hip-hop and rap ballad composed in the key of F Minor, set at a tempo of 80 beats per minute. The melody spans the tonal range of C4 to D♭5, while the music follows the chord progression of Fm-E-Cm–E♭–Db. Its instrumental has been described as "an eerie wail in the background and a smothered kick-and snare-drum pattern". This is noticeable due to its tripped-down production and melancholy harmonies, echoing and somber beats. Rap-Up noted the resemblance between the structure of "Mirror" and "Lighters" (2011) by Bad Meets Evil, which also features Bruno Mars.

In the track, Mars shows his emo-angst by singing: "Through my rise and fall/ You've been my only friend" and Wayne gets "reflective" on his verses "Looking at me now I can see my past/Damn, I look just like my f—king dad/Light it up, that's smoke in mirrors/I even look good in the broken mirror." Wayne not only shows his "warped, troubled mind" but also his softer side by rapping about his father. Overall, Wayne reflects on his past choices and his life. Various publications affirmed that Lil Wayne took inspiration from Michael Jackson in one of his verses: "And no message any clearer, so I'm starting with the "Man in the Mirror" (1987). Idolator Becky Bain found similarities between Wayne's single "How to Love" (2011) from the same album for its "introspective, sad and sweet" lyrics.

Critical reception
The song received positive reviews from most music critics. Lewis Corner of Digital Spy gave the song four stars out of five. He found that "The final result is much like the heartthrob himself; love-torn, moody and destined to be popular." Billboards Joe DeAndrea commented that the track was not only among Lil Wayne's best material, and found the vocals on the hook provided by Mars are quite "smooth". Another Billboard critic, Maria Sherman, praised Mars's hook, calling it "cinematic". Omar Burgess of HipHopDX praised Wayne for "pushing the envelope" describing "Mirror" as a concept track. Conversely, brookencool of Complex included the track on his list of The 10 Worst Lil Wayne Songs. He felt Wayne's and Mars's vocals sounded "forced and pieced together", and deemed the collaboration ineffective. Moreover, the critic found the song's reflective lyrics about Wayne's past and his mistakes shallow compared to Wayne's "All By Myself".

Commercial performance
In the United States, "Mirror" debuted at its peak of number 16 on the Billboard Hot 100, and at number six on the Hot Digital Songs chart, with 149,000 copies sold in its first week. It coincided with the release of Wayne's album Tha Carter IV. The single peaked at numbers 22 and 25 on the Billboard Rhythmic Songs and Hot Rap Songs charts, respectively. The Recording Industry Association of America (RIAA) certified it four times platinum. "Mirror" peaked at number 46 on the Canadian Hot 100. In Australia, the song peaked at number 26, while it peaked at number 12 on the Australia Urban single charts. The Australian Recording Industry Association (ARIA) certified "Mirror" two times platinum with 140,000 copies.

In Europe, "Mirror" debuted at number 12 on the Danish charts, spending 10 weeks there. IFPI Denmark certified it twice Platinum due to its streaming numbers being equivalent to 200,000 copies and it was certified Gold for selling over 15,000 copies. The recording debuted at number 47 on February 18, 2012. It eventually reached its peak at number 11 on April 7, 2012. In the United Kingdom, the song debuted at 91 on the chart and peaked at number 17. The British Phonographic Industry (BPI) certified the song gold. On the Dutch Top 40 charts, "Mirror" peaked at number 12. The song managed to peak at number 13 and 15 respectively in Slovakia and Switzerland.

Music video
Filming for the music video took place in November 2011, directed by Antoine Fuqua. GloriaFX created the visual effects. The company was responsible for the painting and the appearance and disappearance effects among others. Vevo released a teaser of the music video on YouTube on January 27, 2012. The full-length video premiering on Vevo's official website on January 31, 2012.

The video begins with a shirtless Wayne standing in a room, while a camera shows various close-ups of his intricate tattoos. As the chorus begins, Wayne is shown painting the room red and black as Mars sings the chorus, while seated on the top of a ladder. Wayne is also shown throwing red paint on the wall to create an unformed picture. The rest of the video focuses on Wayne blasting red, black and white paint all over the room. It is finally revealed that the painting is of Wayne himself crucified on a treble clef holding a mic in his left hand. The rather convoluted background includes a face, clouds and lightning, all toned in magnificent red. Wayne and Mars stare at the masterpiece as the video comes to an end.

Gregory Adams of Exclaim! complimented Wayne's final painting and called the rapper's video a "bizarre art world exploration". Chris Coplan of Consequence of Sound said that the final scene made the "Mona Lisa look like Dogs Playing Poker."

Personnel
Credits adapted from the liner notes of Tha Carter IV (Deluxe Edition).

Lil Wayne – lead vocals, songwriting
Bruno Mars – lead vocals, songwriting
Philip Lawrence – songwriting
Ramon "REO" Owen of the Soundkillers  – songwriting, production
The Smeezingtons – co–production  

Fabian Marascuillo – mixing
Ghazi Hourani – mixing assistant
Michael "Banger" Cadahia – recording
Edward "Jewfro" Lidow – recording assistant
Brian "Big Bass" Gardner – mastering

Charts

Weekly charts

Year-end charts

Certifications

Release history

See also
Crucifixion in the arts

References

2010s ballads
2011 songs
2011 singles
2012 singles
Lil Wayne songs
Bruno Mars songs
Cash Money Records singles
Music videos directed by Antoine Fuqua
Song recordings produced by the Smeezingtons
Songs written by Lil Wayne
Songs written by Bruno Mars
Songs written by Philip Lawrence (songwriter)
Songs about Michael Jackson
Songs involved in royalties controversies